The Chicagoland 300 was a NASCAR Xfinity Series stock car race held annually at Chicagoland Speedway in Joliet, Illinois. In 2008 the race has been held at night under Chicagoland Speedway's new lighting system, after being held as a day race for the previous 7 years. However, in 2011, the race returned to daytime. From 2016 to 2017, it served as the final race of NASCAR's "regular season" for the Xfinity Series, Following the race, the top 12 drivers in points standings advance to the seven-race NASCAR Xfinity Series playoffs. Starting in 2018, the race moved to June, the weekend before 4th of July. The new race that Las Vegas Motor Speedway acquired from Kentucky Speedway took Chicagoland's former spot.

Past winners

2010: Race extended due to a green–white–checker finish.
2020: Race cancelled and moved to Darlington due to the COVID-19 pandemic.

Multiple winners (drivers)

Multiple winners (teams)

Manufacturer wins

References

External links
 

2001 establishments in Illinois
2020 disestablishments in Illinois
NASCAR Xfinity Series races
Former NASCAR races
 
Recurring sporting events established in 2001
Annual sporting events in the United States
Recurring sporting events disestablished in 2020